Bernd Metzke (born 25 June 1966) is a former East German male handball player. He was a member of the East Germany national handball team. He was part of the  team at the 1988 Summer Olympics. On club level he played for ASK Vorwärts Frankfurt in Frankfurt.

References

1966 births
Living people
People from Bad Belzig
People from Bezirk Potsdam
East German male handball players
Sportspeople from Brandenburg
Olympic handball players of East Germany
Handball players at the 1988 Summer Olympics